Palaina strigata is a species of minute land snail with an operculum, a terrestrial gastropod mollusk or micromollusks in the family Diplommatinidae. This species is endemic to Palau.

References

S
Endemic fauna of Palau
Molluscs of Oceania
Molluscs of the Pacific Ocean
Gastropods described in 1866
Taxonomy articles created by Polbot